Janet MacIver Baker and her husband James K. Baker are the co-founders of Dragon Systems. Together they are credited with creation of Dragon NaturallySpeaking.

In 2012, she received the IEEE James L. Flanagan Speech and Audio Processing Award with her husband.

Baker is currently affiliated with the MIT Media Lab and Harvard Medical School as a visiting scientist and lecturer.

References

Living people
Tufts University alumni
Carnegie Mellon University alumni
MIT Media Lab people
Harvard Medical School faculty
Speech processing researchers
Year of birth missing (living people)